High Frequency Economics, Ltd. is an American economic research consultancy founded by Carl B. Weinberg.  The firm is located in Valhalla, New York.

Description
Founded in 1988 by Carl B. Weinberg, High Frequency Economics publishes "independent analysis of the global economy and markets" in the form of daily research products, offered by subscription only.

The firm's publications include Daily and Weekly Notes on the Global Economy, Daily and Weekly Notes on the United States, Snapshots on the U.S. Economy, and Weekly Notes on China's Economy.  High Frequency Economics also offers periodic global conference calls for its clients and direct access to the firm's team of economists. The firm does not provide investment advice; rather, it provides subscribers with economic knowledge that it believes will help them make day-to-day and long-term investment decisions.

Approximately 350 institutions in 25 countries subscribe to High Frequency Economics' publications, including investment managers, asset allocators, hedge funds and traders. The firm's team of economists have been quoted frequently by The New York Times, The Wall Street Journal, The Times and other media.

History 
Carl Weinberg founded High Frequency Economics in 1988, after leaving Shearson Lehman Brothers, where he served as Senior International Economist.  Initially based in Manhattan, the firm moved to Valhalla, NY, in 1996.

At present, High Frequency Economics has 350 clients in 25 countries worldwide.

Carl Weinberg has served as Chief Economist and managing director of High Frequency Economics since 1988.  The firm announced on June 18, 2012, that effective July 16, 2012, Jim O'Sullivan, formerly Chief Economist of MF Global, would become the new Chief U.S. Economist. Previous Chief U.S. Economists have included David Munro, M. Carey Leahey, and Ian Shepherdson.

On April 14, 2010, Carl Weinberg's debt restructuring plan for Greece was published in the opinion section of the Wall Street Journal. In it, he proposed a multi-year restructuring agreement similar to those used by banks in the 1980s to avert defaults in Latin America. Specifically, he recommended bundling all of Greece's bonds scheduled to mature between 2011 and 2019 into “a single, self-amortizing 25-year bond.”

References

External links
High Frequency Economics Website

Macroeconomics consulting firms